Last Blood, also known as Tornado: The Last Blood is an Italian "macaroni combat" war film directed by Antonio Margheriti and starring Giancarlo Prete.

Plot
An army sergeant attacks his corrupt captain and is court-martialed but before being executed he escapes and, in the enemy-infested jungles of Vietnam, begins a private war against
his fellow soldiers and Vietnamese army soldiers. After escaping border, he was shot dead

Cast
Giancarlo Prete as Sgt. Sal Maggio (as Timothy Brent)  
Antonio Marsina as Captain Harlow  
Luciano Pigozzi as Freeman (as Alan Collins)
Sherman 'Big Train' Bergman as Green Beret (uncredited)
David Brass as Tom, Wounded Soldier (uncredited)
Michael James as US Corporal (uncredited)
Romano Kristoff as Helicopter Pilot (uncredited)
David Light as US Soldier (uncredited)
Edoardo Margheriti as US Soldier (uncredited) 
Mike Monty as Captain Bolen (uncredited)
Ronnie Patterson as MP Sgt. Pike (uncredited)

Home media
The film was released on a US VHS as Tornado in the 1980s by Lightning Video and on German DVD and Blu-Ray as Im Wendekreis des Söldners in the 2010s by Ascot Elite Home Entertainment.

See also 
 List of Italian films of 1983
 Euro War
 War film

References

External links

1980s war films
Films directed by Antonio Margheriti
Films shot in the Philippines
1980s Italian-language films
Cold War films
Macaroni Combat films
Vietnam War films
1980s English-language films
1980s Italian films